Kevin Andreasen, better known by the artistic name Bro (born in Rødovre, Denmark on 13 April 1996), is a Danish singer.

Bro signed a contract with Hurricane Records which is part of Universal Music. His debut single "Hvor er du bro?" was certified platinum in 2016. His hit "Sydpå", the 2018 season theme for Paradise Hotel reality television has topped Hitlisten, the Official Danish Singles Chart.

Before music, Andreasen was developing a professional sports career as a footballer, playing for Brøndby IF's juniors team. He was picked for the U16 Danish National Football Team playing two international games for the selection in 2011 against the U16 Israeli National Football Team.

Discography

Singles

References

1996 births
Living people
People from Rødovre
21st-century Danish male  singers